Encoelia is a genus of fungi in the family Sclerotiniaceae.

Species

Encoelia aterrima
Encoelia carpini
Encoelia cubensis
Encoelia dalongshanica
Encoelia deightonii
Encoelia eliassonii
Encoelia fascicularis
Encoelia fimbriata
Encoelia fissa
Encoelia fuckelii
Encoelia furfuracea
Encoelia fuscobrunnea
Encoelia glaberrima
Encoelia glauca
Encoelia helvola
Encoelia heteromera
Encoelia himalayensis
Encoelia impudicella
Encoelia inculcata
Encoelia indica
Encoelia kirschsteiniana
Encoelia lobata
Encoelia mollisioides
Encoelia montana
Encoelia nebulosa
Encoelia neocaledonica
Encoelia nitida
Encoelia papuana
Encoelia petrakii
Encoelia pruinosa
Encoelia reichenbachii
Encoelia rubiginosa
Encoelia russa
Encoelia salicella
Encoelia singaporensis
Encoelia siparia
Encoelia sitchensis
Encoelia striatula
Encoelia tegularis
Encoelia tiliacea
Encoelia tristis
Encoelia ulmi
Encoelia urceolata

References

Helotiales genera
Sclerotiniaceae